Meadowbank ferry wharf is located on the northern side of the Parramatta River serving the Sydney suburb of Meadowbank.

History
Prior to the construction of the Ryde Bridge in the 1930s, Ryde wharf, located to the east of Meadowbank wharf at the current Ryde Bridge site, was the passenger wharf servicing the area.

Silt in the river and sludge from factory and industrial waste upstream led to the suspension of Sydney Ferries Limited services to Parramatta in 1928, with Meadowbank wharf becoming the westernmost point for ferry services. In December 1993, the State Transit Authority resumed services to Parramatta.

Today Meadowbank wharf is served by Sydney Ferries Parramatta River services operating between Circular Quay and Parramatta. The single wharf is served by First Fleet and RiverCat class ferries. In late 2015, an upgrade of the wharf commenced. It was completed in May 2016.

Wharves & services

Connections
Busways operates one route to and from Meadowbank wharf:
518: to Macquarie University

References

External links

 Meadowbank Wharf at Transport for New South Wales (Archived 12 June 2019)
Meadowbank Local Area Map Transport for NSW

Ferry wharves in Sydney